Ogallala may refer to:
Ogallala, Nebraska
Ogallala Aquifer
Ogallala Commons
Ogallala Formation
Oglala Lakota (Sioux)